The Linn County Courthouse is a historic courthouse located at 108 High Street in Linneus, Linn County, Missouri.  It was built in 1912-1913 and is a three-story, cubic form Beaux Arts style building constructed of concrete, stone and brick.  The building measures 55 feet by 80 feet.

It was added to the National Register of Historic Places in 1999.

References

County courthouses in Missouri
Courthouses on the National Register of Historic Places in Missouri
Beaux-Arts architecture in Missouri
Government buildings completed in 1913
Buildings and structures in Linn County, Missouri
National Register of Historic Places in Linn County, Missouri